Jenn Morel is a Dominican-American singer and songwriter. Her debut single, "Ponteme," peaked at number 3 on the Italian charts. In 2018, she signed with UMLE. She has released tracks on labels such as Insomniac Records.

Early life
Jenn Morel was born in Santiago de los Caballeros. At the age of 6, her family moved to New York. She graduated from Lehman College with a Bachelor of Arts degree in sociology and dance.

Career
Morel's break into music industry was as a dancer in night clubs. She later appeared in music videos for Drake, Nicki Minaj and Trey Songz. She also appeared in videos for LMFAO and Neyo.

Her debut single, "Ponteme," was released on 23 June 2017. It peaked at number 3 on the Italian charts. 

Her single "Tra" was inspired by Don Chezina. She performed at the 2019 SXSW Festival.

She also released the single "Tiguere" for Insomniac Records, a collaboration with JST JR. In 2018, she signed with UMLE. She had a new album come out in 2020. She was featured in the Sounds of LatinX collection by Spotify.

Personal life
She lives in Los Angeles.

Discography

Albums 
2020– Jenn Morel

Singles

References

 Jenn Morel FR:

External links

Living people
21st-century Dominican Republic women singers
Dominican Republic songwriters
1990 births